Edward Dziewoński (16 December 1916 in Moscow, Russian Empire – 17 August 2002 in Warsaw, Poland) was a Polish stage and film actor, and theatre director.

He studied acting at Państwowy Instytut Sztuki Teatralnej and debuted at the Syrena Theatre. He later played in the National Theatre, the Ateneum Theatre, the Współczesny Theatre, and the Komedia Theatre - and was founder and director of the Kwadrat Theatre. He was also a popular artist at satirical theatres (cabarets) such as: Kabaret Szpak, Kabaret Wagabunda, Kabaret Starszych Panów, and the one he founded and directed at - Kabaret Dudek.

Selected filmography
 Ostatni etap (1948)
 Dom na pustkowiu (1949)
 Przygoda na Mariensztacie (1953)
 A Matter to Settle (1953)
 Nikodem Dyzma (1956)
 Eroica (1958)
 Zezowate szczęście (1960)
 Jutro premiera (1962)
 Żona dla Australijczyka (1963)
 Dolina Issy (1982)
 Straszny sen Dzidziusia Górkiewicza (1993)

External links
 

1916 births
2002 deaths
Burials at Powązki Cemetery
Polish cabaret performers
Polish male film actors
Polish male stage actors
Polish male television actors
Polish theatre directors
Commanders with Star of the Order of Polonia Restituta
Recipients of the Gold Cross of Merit (Poland)
20th-century Polish male actors
20th-century comedians